African High Life is the debut album by Nigerian drummer and percussionist Solomon Ilori recorded in 1963 and released on the Blue Note label. The album was reissued on CD in 2006 with three bonus tracks recorded at a later session.

Reception
Allmusic awarded the album 4 stars and reviewer Brandon Burke stated "this is a very enjoyable if not essential album of traditional African highlife music set to dance tempos". The All About Jazz review by Chris May called the original album "pleasant, if unspectacular, palm-wine highlife outings from the West African tradition, distinguished by some masterful drumming, but diminished by strangely inept alto saxophone contributions" but stated the bonus tracks "anticipate—with great brio and deep grooves—the astral jazz of the late '60s and early '70s, and the world jazz which has in turn followed".

Track listing
All compositions by Solomon Ilori
 "Tolani (African Love Song)" – 7:44
 "Ise Oluwa (God's Work Is Indestructable)" – 5:39
 "Follow Me to Africa" – 5:29
 "Yaba E (Farewell)" – 5:30
 "Jojolo (Look at This Beautiful Girl)" – 7:17
 "Aiye Le (The Troubled World)" – 3:25
 "Gbogbo Omo Ibile (Going Home)" – 11:47 Bonus track on CD reissue
 "Agbamurero (Rhino)" – 13:54 Bonus track on CD reissue
 "Igbesi Aiye (Song of Praise to God)" – 13:22 Bonus track on CD reissue
Notes
Recorded at Van Gelder Studio, Englewood Cliffs, New Jersey on April 25, 1963 (tracks 1-6) and October 30, 1964 (tracks 7-9)

Personnel
Solomon Ilori – vocal, pennywhistle, talking drum, guitar
Chief Bey, Roger Sanders (tracks 7-9), Ladji Camara (tracks 7-9), Sonny Morgan (tracks 7-9) – conga, hand drum, percussion
Josiah Ilori – sakara drum, cowbell (tracks 1-6)
Robert Crowder – conga, shekere, cowbell (tracks 1-6)
Montego Joe – conga (tracks 1-6)
Garvin Masseaux – conga, xylophone, cowbell (tracks 1-6)
Jay Berliner – guitar (tracks 1-6)
Hosea Taylor – alto saxophone, flute (tracks 1-6)
Donald Byrd – trumpet (tracks 7-9)
Hubert Laws – tenor saxophone, flute (tracks 7-9)
Elvin Jones – drums (tracks 7-9)
Ahmed Abdul-Malik (tracks 1-6), Bob Cranshaw (tracks 7-9)  – bass
Coleridge-Taylor Perkinson – piano, musical director

References

Blue Note Records albums
Solomon Ilori albums
1963 albums
Albums recorded at Van Gelder Studio
Yoruba-language albums
Albums produced by Alfred Lion